US Pontet Grand Avignon 84 (previously Union Sportive Le Pontet Football) is a football club based in Le Pontet, Vaucluse, France. They play at the Stade de Montbord in Le Pontet.

History
The club was formed in 1980 under the name of Olympique Pontétien. It was not until 1984 that they changed their name to Union Sportive Le Pontet Football. In May 2017 the club voted to rename US Pontet Grand Avignon 84.

References

External links
 Official Site

Pontet
1980 establishments in France
Sport in Vaucluse
Football clubs in Provence-Alpes-Côte d'Azur